Don and Nona Williams Stadium is a football stadium located on the campus of the University of Wisconsin–Stout in Menomonie, Wisconsin.  The stadium is home to the UW–Stout Blue Devils, the Menomonie High School Mustangs, plus other high school games, as well as other sports at UW–Stout.  The stadium is named in honor of Don Williams, a former member of the UW–Stout Board of Directors, and his wife, Nona.  The couple made a significant contribution towards the construction of the stadium.

The UW–Stout football team played its home games at Nelson Field on the UW–Stout campus through the beginning of the 2001 season.  Nelson Field is now home to the UW–Stout Soccer teams.

AstroTurf 2000 was the surface from its opening through the 2007–08 academic year.  FieldTurf was installed for the beginning of the 2008 football season. In 2016, there was new field turf added with the Blue Devil logo.

Drums Along The Red Cedar, a drum & bugle corps competition, was held at the stadium each June until 2010, where the show was rained out.

The stadium is also used by Menomonie High School.

References

External links
 UW–Stout Williams Stadium page

American football venues in Wisconsin
College football venues
Buildings and structures in Dunn County, Wisconsin
High school football venues in the United States
2001 establishments in Wisconsin
Sports venues completed in 2001